Jupiter One is the self-titled album by American indie rock band Jupiter One. The album was re-released in 2008, which included two more tracks, "Umbrellas" and "Summer Song". Several tracks from the album have been used in Electronic Arts video games. "Countdown" was featured in Madden NFL 08, "Unglued" in FIFA 08, "Turn Up The Radio" in NHL 08, Platform Moon" in FIFA 09, and "Fire Away" in Burnout Paradise.

Track listing

2008 re-release

References

2005 albums
Jupiter One albums